Anabarsky District (Anaabır uluuha) is an administrative and municipal district (raion, or ulus), one of the thirty-four in the Sakha Republic, Russia. It is located in the northwest of the republic and borders with Bulunsky District in the east, Olenyoksky District in the south, and with Taymyrsky Dolgano-Nenetsky District of Krasnoyarsk Krai in the west. Its administrative center is the rural locality (a selo) of Saskylakh. As of the 2010 Census, the total population of the district was 3,501, with the population of Saskylakh accounting for 66.2% of that number.

Geography 
The district is washed by the Laptev Sea in the north. The landscape of the district is mostly flat. The main rivers are the Anabar, with its tributaries the Suolama and Udya, as well as the Uele. The Anabar and Uele have their mouth in Anabar Bay. There are numerous lakes, the largest one is Lake Sappyya.

Climate

History 
The district was established on December 30, 1930.

Administrative and municipal status
Within the framework of administrative divisions, Anabarsky District is one of the thirty-four in the republic. The district is divided into three rural okrugs (naslegs) which comprise three rural localities. As a municipal division, the district is incorporated as Anabarsky Municipal District. Its three rural okrugs are incorporated into two rural settlements within the municipal district. The selo of Saskylakh serves as the administrative center of both the administrative and municipal district.

Inhabited localities

Economy
The economy of the district is mostly based on mining, reindeer husbandry, fishing, and hunting. There are deposits of diamonds in the district.

Demographics 
As of the 2010 Census, the ethnic composition was as follows:
Dolgans: 42.4%
Evenks: 22.7%
Yakuts: 21.6%
Evens: 6.4%
Russians: 3.7%
Ukrainians: 0.9%
others: 2.2%

The village of Yuryung-Khaya is the only settlement in the Sakha Republic where Dolgans form a majority of the population.

References

Notes

Sources
Official website of the Sakha Republic. Registry of the Administrative-Territorial Divisions of the Sakha Republic. Anabarsky District. 

Districts of the Sakha Republic